Zaida R. "Cucusa" Hernández Torres (born August 30, 1952) is a Puerto Rican politician who served as the Speaker of the Puerto Rican House of Representatives from 1993 to 1996. She also served as At-Large Representative from 1985 to 1997, and as Chairman of the San Juan NPP Municipal Committee from 1995 to 1997. Earned a Juris Doctor from the Interamerican University of Puerto Rico School of Law.

Previous to being a legislator, Hernández served as a Prosecutor in the Puerto Rico Justice Department. After her tenure as Speaker of the House, Hernández served as Appellate Court Judge from 1998 to 2008. In May 2012, she became the center of a scandal when a photograph of politician Rafael Cox Alomar who was, at the time, the Popular Democratic Party's candidate for Resident Commissioner of Puerto Rico in the U.S. Congress was posted on her Twitter account comparing him to a chimpanzee and with the words "R.I.P. Yuyo". Human rights defenders criticized Hernández for the personal attack against Cox Alomar, who is of Afro-Puerto Rican ancestry, however, in statement she claimed her Twitter account was hacked and that she did not post the offensive image. She later apologized to Cox Alomar and terminated her Twitter account, promising to avoid social networks.

See also

1996 San Juan, Puerto Rico mayoral election

References

Interamerican University of Puerto Rico alumni
People from Morovis, Puerto Rico
Speakers of the House of Representatives of Puerto Rico
Living people
1952 births